X-League or X League may refer to:

 X League (women's football), a women's American football league that began play in 2022
 X-League (Japan), an American football league based in Japan that was founded in 1971
 X-League Indoor Football, an indoor American football league that played in 2014–2015
 Xleague.tv, a UK broadcast production unit that operated during 2007–2009

See also
 
 
 Legio X (disambiguation), various Roman "X Legions"
 Super League X, an English Rugby League season in 2005
 X Division, a style of professional wrestling
 XFL (disambiguation)
 XFL (2001), a professional American football league in the United States that played for one season in 2001
 XFL (2020), the second incarnation of the league